Impacto is a 1964 album recorded by saxophonist and composer Hector Costita and his sextet. The album is one of the most important in the musician career and presents a fusion of bossa nova and jazz. Hector Costita elaborated all arrangements and conducted the other musicians.

A long period after its recording, it was reissued on CD in 2006 as one of the albums included in Som Livre Masters series, organized by Charles Gavin.

Track listing

Personnel

Hector Costita: saxophone, flute
Magno D'Alcantara (Maguinho): trumpet
Benedito Pereira dos Santos (Ditinho): trombone
Luiz Mello: piano, celeste
Rezala José (Turquinho): drums
Manoel Luiz Vianna (Xú): bass

Special guests:
Edison Machado: drums (in 'Insensatez', 'Impacto', 'Gabriela' and 'Primavera')
Sebastião Netto: bass (in 'Impacto' and 'Gabriela')
Elias Slon: violin (in 'Insensatez', 'Vivo sonhando' and 'Primavera')
Flavio Russo: cello (in 'Insensatez' and 'Primavera')

1964 albums
Hector Costita albums
Som Livre albums
Albums conducted by Hector Costita
Albums arranged by Hector Costita